Edward J. Freel is an American politician. He served as Secretary of State of Delaware from 1994 to 2001, during the administration of Gov. Tom Carper.

References

External links
Bio

Secretaries of State of Delaware
Living people
Year of birth missing (living people)
Place of birth missing (living people)
20th-century American politicians